Baadarâne, is an area in Chouf, Mont Liban, Lebanon.

Baadarane is a town with an elevation of 1050m. It is known for the remains in al (Meydan) which is an old building and is located on a mountain so the weather is cold and especially in winter, snow covers the town.

Airport
The area is home to an abandoned airfield built during the Lebanese Civil War but never operated as active aerodrome. The concrete runway is the only visible infrastructure.

References

Populated places in Chouf District